Sawing Gantimpala is a 1940 Filipino film directed by Manuel Conde. It stars Ely Ramos, Mila del Sol and Dina Valle.

External links
 

1940 films
Filipino-language films
Tagalog-language films
Philippine black-and-white films
Philippine romantic drama films
1940 romantic drama films